Paul Willis (born 21 August 1991) is a Scottish footballer who last played as a midfielder for Linlithgow Rose.

Willis began his career with Dunfermline Athletic, and has also played for Ayr United, East Fife (three spells), Berwick Rangers (two spells), Albion Rovers, Peterhead and Stirling Albion, as well as for Canadian club Kingston FC.

Career
Willis was signed for Dunfermline Athletic under-15s by Jim McArthur from local side Hutchison Vale. He progressed up the ranks playing for the under-17s for a season before being promoted to the under-19 squad for the 2007–2008 season. In February 2008, Willis was promoted to the Dunfermline Athletic first team squad after impressing at the lower levels. On 1 March 2008, Willis made his début against Livingston, being brought on for Alex Burke in the 83rd minute.

In June 2013, it was announced that Willis had signed with East Fife. It was mutually agreed to terminate his contract with East Fife in February 2014. After his release from East Fife he had a brief stint overseas in Canada with Kingston FC of the Canadian Soccer League. Willis signed for Berwick Rangers in July 2014. At the end of 2014–15 season, Willis signed for Scottish League One newcomers Albion Rovers on a one-year contract.

Willis played with Rovers for two seasons, before returning to Bayview to sign for East Fife on 25 May 2017. After failing to make an impact in Methil, Willis signed for Berwick Rangers on 31 January 2018, having previously played for the side 3-years earlier. Willis moved to Peterhead in January 2019, but would later sign for Stirling Albion in the summer, with the Binos announcing the transfer on 13 June 2019.

Willis signed with East of Scotland team Linlithgow Rose in July 2020. Willis departed the club on 12 November 2020.

References

External links

Living people
1991 births
Scottish footballers
Footballers from Edinburgh
Dunfermline Athletic F.C. players
Ayr United F.C. players
East Fife F.C. players
Kingston FC players
Berwick Rangers F.C. players
Albion Rovers F.C. players
Peterhead F.C. players
Association football midfielders
Scottish Football League players
Scottish Premier League players
Scottish Professional Football League players
Canadian Soccer League (1998–present) players
Scottish expatriate sportspeople in Canada
Expatriate soccer players in Canada
Scottish expatriate footballers
Stirling Albion F.C. players
Linlithgow Rose F.C. players